Anima Roy is a Bangladeshi Rabindra Sangeet singer and professor of music at Jagannath University.

Biography
Roy learned music from Debasish Chakrabarty, Sadhon Chandra Barman and Surbani Lalitakala Academy. Then she was trained under Waheedul Haq, Sanjida Khatun and Mita Haque. She completed a Rabindra Sangeet course from Chhayanaut.

In 2013, Roy joined the faculty at Jagannath University as a lecturer in the Department of Theatre and Music. Two years later, she was promoted to associate professor. By 2019, she was chair of the Department of Music, which had split from the Department of Theatre in 2016.

Discography
 Kotha Jao (2009)
 Ami Chitrangada (2010)
 Icchamoti
 Robir Alo (2014)
 Tomaro Birohe
 Praner Majhe Aay (2015)
 Matribhumi (2016)

Awards
Roy received the award for Rabindra Sangeet at the 12th Channel i Music Awards for her album Matribhumi.

References

External links
 Personal profile from Jagannath University website

20th-century Bangladeshi women singers
20th-century Bangladeshi singers
Living people
University of Dhaka alumni
Year of birth missing (living people)
21st-century Bangladeshi women singers
21st-century Bangladeshi singers